The Z203/204 Beijing-Harbin Through Train (Chinese:Z203/204次北京到哈尔滨直达特快列车) is Chinese railway running between the capital Beijing to Harbin, capital of Heilongjiang express passenger trains by the Beijing Railway Bureau, Harbin passenger segment responsible for passenger transport task, Harbin originating on the Beijing train. 25T Type Passenger trains running along the Jingha Railway across Heilongjiang, Jilin, Liaoning, Hebei, Tianjin, Beijing and other provinces and cities, the entire 1249 km. Beijing railway station to Harbin railway station running 10 hours and 48 minutes, use trips for Z203; Harbin railway station to Beijing railway station to run 11 hours and 16 minutes, use trips for Z204.

See also 
Z1/2 Beijing-Harbin Through Train
Z15/16 Beijing-Harbin Through Train
D27/28 Beijing-Harbin Through Train
D101/102 Beijing-Harbin Through Train
G381/382 Beijing-Harbin Through Train
G393/394 Beijing-Harbin Through Train

References

External links 
 20日起哈尔滨至北京新增一对“Z”字头列车

Passenger rail transport in China
Rail transport in Beijing
Rail transport in Heilongjiang